District 18 of the Texas Senate is a senatorial district that currently serves all of Aransas, Austin, Burleson, Calhoun, Colorado, DeWitt, Fayette, Goliad, Gonzales, Jackson, Lavaca, Lee, Matagorda, Refugio, Victoria, Waller, Washington and Wharton counties, western portions of Fort Bend and Harris counties, and an eastern precinct of Nueces County in the U.S. state of Texas.

The current Senator from District 18 is Lois Kolkhorst.

Top 5 biggest cities in district
District 18 has a population of 809,726 with 587,890 that is at voting age from the 2010 census.

Election history
Election history of District 21 from 1992.

Previous elections

2020

2016

2014

2012

2010

2006

2002

1998

1994

1992

District officeholders

Notes

References

18
Aransas County, Texas
Austin County, Texas
Burleson County, Texas
Calhoun County, Texas
Colorado County, Texas
DeWitt County, Texas
Fayette County, Texas
Fort Bend County, Texas
Goliad County, Texas
Gonzales County, Texas
Harris County, Texas
Jackson County, Texas
Lavaca County, Texas
Lee County, Texas
Matagorda County, Texas
Nueces County, Texas
Refugio County, Texas
Victoria County, Texas
Waller County, Texas
Washington County, Texas
Wharton County, Texas